The Enea Tree Museum is a 75,000 m2 park near Lake Zurich in Rapperswil-Jona, Canton of St. Gallen, Switzerland. The tree museum shows over 50 trees from over 25 species as well as sculptures by international artists.

History 
The tree museum, founded in 2010, was planned and built by landscape architect Enzo Enea. The property at Lake Zürich was leased from the Mariazell-Wurmsbach Cistercian Abbey. Before the construction, water had to be extracted from the former wetland. For this purpose, an avenue of swamp cypresses was set up. This tree species naturally extracts a lot of water from the soil (evapotranspiration). Today this avenue forms the entrance to the tree museum. The museum has been open to the public since it opened.

Tree population 
The trees growing in the tree museum should have been felled, but were rescued by Enea and replanted in the tree museum. The following specimens belong to the tree population:

Art 
Sculptures by international artists can be found in the tree museum. The following works of art are curated in the Tree Museum:

External links 

 Enea Tree Museum
 Report on the opening in the New York Times
 Report by Arte Metropolis
 Report on welt.de
 Portrait by myswitzerland.com

References 

2010 establishments in Switzerland
Botanical gardens in Switzerland
Tourist attractions in Switzerland
Museums in Switzerland